Hindaza is a Palestinian village located six kilometers south-east of Bethlehem. The village is in the Bethlehem Governorate Southern West Bank. According to the Palestinian Central Bureau of Statistics, the village had a population of 4,779 in 2007. The primary healthcare is obtained in Za'atara where the Ministry of Heath have classified the care facilities as level 3.

Footnotes

External links
Hindaza village (fact sheet), Applied Research Institute–Jerusalem, ARIJ
Hindaza village profile, ARIJ
Hindaza  aerial photo, ARIJ
 The priorities and needs for development in Hindaza village based on the community and local authorities' assessment

Villages in the West Bank
Bethlehem Governorate
Municipalities of the State of Palestine